This is a list of the National Register of Historic Places listings in Fillmore County, Minnesota.  It is intended to be a complete list of the properties and districts on the National Register of Historic Places in Fillmore County, Minnesota, United States.  The locations of National Register properties and districts for which the latitude and longitude coordinates are included below, may be seen in an online map.

There are 36 properties and districts listed on the National Register in the county.

History
Fillmore County's National Register properties reflect its development as an agricultural region typical of Southeast Minnesota.  Euro-American settlement began in the 1850s and initially relied on rivers and stagecoach roads for transportation.  The Forestville Townsite, now a living history museum, preserves a portion of one of these early communities.  Several towns vied for county seat status; the William Strong House in Carimona and the Fillmore County Jail and Carriage House in Preston were nominated as the best surviving structures representing this period.

Fillmore County's many rivers and streams powered a milling region of statewide importance before Minneapolis achieved primacy.  Additionally, properties like the Quickstad Farm Implement Company and Rushford Wagon and Carriage Company represent the agricultural focus of manufacturing in the county.  The Gilded Age prosperity of population centers like Spring Valley and Chatfield is reflected by other listings, several of which are noted for their architecture.

Current listings

|}

See also
 List of National Historic Landmarks in Minnesota
 National Register of Historic Places listings in Minnesota

References

External links

 Minnesota National Register Properties Database—Minnesota Historical Society

Fillmore County